The Book of Jehu is a lost text that may have been written by the Biblical prophet Jehu ben Hanani, who was one of King Baasha's contemporaries. The book is described in : "Now the rest of the acts of Jehoshaphat, first and last, behold, they are written in the book of Jehu the son of Hanani, which is mentioned in the book of the Kings of Israel."

This manuscript is sometimes called Annals of Jehu ben Hanani

See also 
 Table of books of Judeo-Christian Scripture
 Lost work

References

Lost Jewish texts

cs:Jehú (prorok)